The Ministry of Defence of the Republic of Belarus is the government organisation that is charged with the duties of raising and maintaining the Armed Forces of Belarus.

The formation of the ministry began in March 1992, after the events of 1991 in which the Soviet Union had effectively dissolved. The ministry was formed on the basis of the former Headquarters of the Soviet Army's Belorussian Military District. Seven officers have served as Minister of Defence of Belarus: Petr Chaus, Pavel Kozlovskii, Anatoly Kostenko, Leonid Maltsev (1995–96), Colonel General Alexander Chumakov, a Russian officer, (1996–2001), Yuriy Zhadobin (2009–2014), Andrei Ravkov (2014–2020), and Viktor Khrenin (2020–present).

The ministry is part of the Security Council of Belarus, interdepartmental meeting with a mandate to ensure the security of the state. The President, currently Alexander Lukashenko, appoints the Minister of Defence, who heads the ministry, as well as the heads of the armed services. These four appointees meet with the Secretary of the Security Council every two months. Security Council decisions are approved by a qualified majority of those present. Since 2020, the position of Minister of Defence has been filled by Major General Viktor Khrenin.

The budget of the defence ministry in May 2018 was €560 million. Another source said the military budget was pegged at around 1% GDP.

Structure

Military Authorities
The following departments are under the control of the defence ministry:

Central Support Elements  
Office of the Minister of Defense
Deputy Ministers
General Staff of the Armed Forces
Main Operations Directorate
Main Intelligence Directorate
Main Organizational Mobilization Directorate
Main Ideology Directorate 
Main Policy Directorate
Department of Information-Analytics
Department of Communications
Department of Territorial Defense
Department of Missile Forces and Artillery
Department of Finance
Logistics 
Food Management
Clothing Management
Military Medical Administration
432nd Main Military Clinical Medical Centre
592nd Military Clinical Medical Center
1134th Military Clinical Medical Center
23rd Sanitary and Epidemiological Center
222nd Medical Center of the Air Force and Air Defense Forces
223rd Aviation Medicine Center of the Air Force and Air Defense Forces
2335th Storage Base for Medical Equipment and Property
Housing Management
Other elements
Sports Committee of the Armed Forces
General Financial and Economic Department
Legal Department
Central Archives
Dog Training Center (Kolodishchi)

Military educational institutions
Military Academy of Belarus
Minsk Suvorov Military School
Border Guard Service Institute of Belarus
Belarusian State University
Belarusian State University of Informatics and Radioelectronics
Belarusian National Technical University
Belarusian State Medical University
Grodno State University
Belarusian State University of Transport
Belarusian State Academy of Aviation

Leaders

Ministers of Defense
 Pyotr Chaus (1992)
 Pavel Kozlovski (1992–1994)
 Anatoly Kostenko (1994–1995)
 Leonid Maltsev (first term, 1996)
 Aleksandr Chumakov (1996–2001)
 Leonid Maltsev (second term, 2001–2009)
 Yury Zhadobin (2009–2014)
 Andrei Ravkov (2014–2020)
 Viktor Khrenin (2020–present)

First Deputy Minister of Defence — Chief of the General Staff 

 Nikolay Churkin (1992–1994)
 Leonid Maltsev (1994–1995)
 Aleksandr Petrovich Chumakov (1995–1997)
 Mikhail Kozlov (1997–2001)
 Sergey Gurulev (2001–2009)
 Petr Tikhonovsky (2009–2013)
 Oleg Belokonev (2014–2019)
 Alexander Volfovich (2020–2021)
 Viktor Gulevich (since 2021)

Deputy Ministers of Defence
Vladimir Uskhopchik (2000-2004)
Yuri Merentsov (2004–2009)
Mikhail Puzikov (2009–2015)
Sergei Potapenko (2016–present)

Defence ministry building
In the late 1940s, a hill above Śvisłač in the Pukhavichy District was used to lay the foundation for the HQ of the Belarusian Military District. The project was entrusted to the architect Valentin Gusev, who risked not demolishing the ancient buildings surrounding it. It later became the defense ministry in 1992.

Symbols

Emblem 
The heraldic sign - the emblem of the Ministry of Defense of the Republic of Belarus was approved in April 2003. The heraldic sign is a stylized golden image of the emblem of the Armed Forces, located in the center of a red figured shield (baroque type). The border of the shield is silvery.

Banner 
The banner of the Ministry of Defense of the Republic of Belarus was approved by the decree of the President on November 17, 2000. The banner consists of a double panel, a staff with a pommel and an inflow, a cord with tassels and a banner ribbon.

Media 

 Military News Agency "Vayar"  (includes the newspaper "To the Glory of the Motherland", the magazine "Army", and the TV show "Arsenal")
 Ministry of Defense website
 Microblog

References

External links

Belarus's New Military Doctrine: What’s The Message?

 
1992 establishments in Belarus
Defence ministers of Belarus
Defence ministries
Defense